The 1976 United States Senate election in Connecticut took place on November 2, 1976. Incumbent Republican U.S. Senator Lowell Weicker won re-election to a second term over Secretary of State Gloria Schaffer.

General election

Candidates
Robert Barnabei (George Wallace)
Gloria Schaffer, Connecticut Secretary of State (Democratic)
Lowell P. Weicker, Jr., incumbent U.S. Senator since 1971 (Republican)

Results

See also 
 1976 United States Senate elections

References

Connecticut
1976
1976 Connecticut elections